Manihot pulchriforius is a flowering shrub that ranges from 1–2.5 meters tall. It grows in the preserved mountains of Serra Dourada, in the state of Goiás, Brazil, and is commonly found growing on rocky outcrops between 900m and 1000m in elevation. The shrub produces deep red or purple flowers, and bears dark green fruit with purple wings.

References

Manihoteae